Workman may refer to:
 Workman (horse)
 Workman (surname), an English surname
 Workman keyboard layout, an alternative English keyboard layout for ergonomic usage
 Workman Publishing Company, an American publisher
 Workman Township, Minnesota, United States

See also 
 Worker (disambiguation)